A Spy Among Friends is a British espionage thriller television series, starring Guy Pearce and Damian Lewis. It is based on the book of the same name by Ben Macintyre, adapted by Alex Cary and directed by Nick Murphy. It was available to stream on ITVX in the United Kingdom from December 2022, Amazon Prime Video in Canada from February 2023, and MGM+ in the United States from March 2023.

Synopsis
In England in 1963, Nicholas Elliott (Lewis) works for MI6 as an intelligence officer but is left in turmoil when he learns his close friend and colleague Kim Philby (Pearce) had been secretly working as a double agent for the KGB and has defected to the Soviet Union.

Cast
 Guy Pearce as Kim Philby
 Damian Lewis as Nicholas Elliott
 Anna Maxwell Martin as Lily Thomas 
 Adrian Edmondson as Sir Roger Hollis
 Stephen Kunken as James Jesus Angleton
 Nicholas Rowe as Anthony Blunt
 Monika Gossmann	as Galina
 Karel Roden	as Col. Sergei Brontov
 Anastasia Hille	 as Flora Solomon
 Edward Baker-Duly	as Ian Fleming
 Radoslaw Kaim	as Konstantin Dmitrievich Volkov

Episodes

Production
Principal photography took place in London, England and Romania, and finished in the spring of 2022.

Broadcast
Broadcast in the United
Kingdom on the streaming service ITVX was moved with a delay in the launch of ITVX from 1 November 2022 to 8 December 2022. In February 2023 the series became available in Canada via Amazon Prime Video. The series will be available on MGM+ from March 12, 2023 in the United States.

Reception 
Critical reception of A Spy Among Friends was mixed, with Rebecca Nicholson of The Guardian saying, "There are plenty of small thrills to be had from a world built on codes and double meanings." Stephanie Bunbury with Deadline wrote that the "unfolding of their negotiations" was "not seat-of-your-pants televisual excitement, but it is the stuff of sustained intrigue". Jay Skelton with Reel Mockery called A Spy Among Friends "frustrating to watch". However, Nick Hilton with The Independent said, "there is much to enjoy about A Spy Among Friends".

References

External links

 

Espionage television series
2022 British television series debuts
2022 British television series endings
2020s British drama television series
ITV television dramas
2020s British television miniseries
British thriller television series
Secret Intelligence Service in fiction
KGB in fiction
Spy thriller television series
Television series set in 1963
Television series by ITV Studios
Television series by Sony Pictures Television
Television shows based on books
Television shows filmed in England
Television shows filmed in Romania
English-language television shows